Amblyseius erlangensis is a species of mite in the family Phytoseiidae.

References

erlangensis
Articles created by Qbugbot
Animals described in 1962